Ratnamala may refer to:

People
Rani Ratnamala Devi, Indian politician
Rathnamala Prakash (born 1952), Indian singer
Ratnamala Savanur (born 1950), Indian politician

Other uses
 Ratnamala (film), a 1947 Telugu film